José Ramón Patterson (born 1958) is a Spanish journalist. He is the former director of Radio Nacional de España and TVE in Asturias, who was also a diplomatic correspondent for TVE in Brussels.

In 2015 he became the correspondent for the public broadcaster in Brussels, replacing Álvaro López de Goicoechea.

References

External links
 
 

1958 births
Living people
Spanish television journalists
Television reporters and correspondents